Laurynas Gucevičius (1753–1798) was an 18th-century architect from the Grand Duchy of Lithuania, and all of his designs were built there.

In his youth he travelled to Italy and Paris and other countries in Western Europe, where he studied architecture under the notable contemporary neo-classical French architects, Jacques-Germain Soufflot and Claude Nicolas Ledoux. Later he was appointed professor at the Jesuit Academy of Vilnius, the predecessor of the University of Vilnius. Among the best known of his works are the Vilnius Cathedral, the town hall and the summer palace of bishops in Verkiai. The monumentality of forms and volume, the harmony with surroundings and a special treatment of antique architectural forms are the characteristics of his style.

Biography

Born in the village of Migonys near Kupiškis, in the Grand Duchy of Lithuania. His father was a Lithuanian peasant, Simonas Masiulis. He was baptized as Laurynas Masiulis. His Lithuanian mother, Kotryna Žekonytė Masiulienė died early in his youth, and her relative and his godmother Anna Gucewicz née Baltušytė (supported him and financed his studies. After her he changed his surname to Gucevičius. He attended local schools at Kupiškis and Palėvenė and then the gymnasium in Panevėžys. According to his biograph Karol Podczaszyński school in Kupiškis was the place were he for the first time started to learn Polish language. In 1773 he joined the Academy of Vilnius. He studied engineering, attended the lectures on architecture held by Marcin Knackfus. Around that time, he also became a missionary monk.

He graduated in 1775 and in the following year received a royal scholarship from King Stanisław August Poniatowski. Along with a large number of other young Polish artists and architects of the time (among them Chrystian Piotr Aigner, Szymon Bogumił Zug, Stanisław Zawadzki, Efraim Szreger and Jakub Kubicki), he went to Rome, where he spent a year studying the classical architecture.

In the following years he travelled through the countries of Western Europe, where he attended lectures on architecture and learned from the works of the most renowned architects of the time. He visited France, Denmark, Sweden and various German states. He spent a year and a half studying in Paris under the guidance of Jacques-Germain Soufflot and Claude Nicolas Ledoux. On his return, he was hired by Bishop Ignacy Jakub Massalski, for whom he designed and built the episcopal palace in Verkiai, later known after its later owners, the Wittgenstein family. The palace and the surrounding architectural complex, the work on which was commenced by Gucevičius's tutor Knackfus, is currently considered one of the most valuable classicist complexes in Lithuania.

In 1789 Gucevičius became a professor of architecture and topography at the Artillery and Engineering Corps' School of Vilnius. In 1794 he also returned to his Alma Mater, where he became a professor of civilian architecture and held the chair in engineering. In 1794, at the outbreak of Kościuszko's Uprising, Gucevičius joined the ranks of the local civil guard and took part in the Vilnius Uprising against the Russian garrison. He became one of the leaders of the local militia formed out of volunteers. Wounded in a skirmish near Ashmiany (modern Belarus), he was demobilised. Following the Partitions of Poland, when Vilnius was annexed by Imperial Russia, the new authorities expelled Gucevičius from the academy for his part in the uprising. However, in 1797 he returned there, this time as a head of the newly founded separate chair of architecture.

Around that time Gucevičius created the most renowned of his works. First was the new town hall of Vilnius, completed around 1799. He also constructed a similar, yet smaller town hall in Widze near Bratslav (modern Vidzy, Belarus). Between 1777 and in 1801 he worked to rebuild the  Vilnius Cathedral (which had undergone many reconstructions, and had been partially Baroque) in the neoclassical style. It is sometimes said that his reconstruction of the cathedral, modelled after a Roman temple, pre-dated the work of Thomas Hamilton and James Playfair, two notable Scottish architects to introduce classicism in the United Kingdom.

He is credited with a number of other projects, although their actual authorship is not documented. Among them is the palace of the Tyzenhaus family in Rokiškis (completed in 1801), the reconstruction of the castle in Raudonė for its contemporary owners, the Olędzki (Olendzki) h. Rawicz family and  the  manor house in Čiobiškis.  He is also thought to have prepared designs of palaces for other notable magnate families of the time, including Radziwiłł, Sapieha, Pac, Chomiński and Scypion, though World War II losses in the preserved archives make the matter difficult to settle definitively. Additionally, he designed  several merchant houses in Kretinga and was the author of a topographic map of the western part of the city of Vilnius.

He died on 10 December 1798. The location of his burial is unknown but is presumed to be the churchyard of the Church of St. Stephen in Vilnius. In his last will he dedicated all of his projects to the Polish–Lithuanian Commonwealth, and some of the surviving sketches and designs are currently held in the library of Warsaw University.

Legacy 
The architect's life and creations inspired Lithuanian poet Justinas Marcinkevičius to write the play The Cathedral.

Notes

References

1753 births
1798 deaths
Architects from Vilnius
Kościuszko insurgents
Neoclassical architects
Academic staff of Vilnius University
People from Panevėžys County
18th-century Polish–Lithuanian architects
Burials at Rasos Cemetery
Polish architects